Llanbedr is a village in Gwynedd, northwest Wales.

Llanbedr may also refer to other Welsh settlements:

North Wales
Llanbedr-y-Cennin, Caerhun, Conwy valley
Llanbedr Dyffryn Clwyd, near Ruthin, Denbighshire

South Wales
Llanbedr, Crickhowell,  Vale of Grwyney, Powys
Llanbedr, Painscastle, near Painscastle, Powys
Llanbedr, a hamlet in Langstone, Newport
 Lampeter, Ceredigion

See also
 Llanbedr Airport, Gwynedd